Poddubny is a rural locality (a khutor) in Mikhaylovka Urban Okrug, Volgograd Oblast, Russia. The population was 145 as of 2010. There are 5 streets.

Geography 
Poddubny is located 24 km southwest of Mikhaylovka. Archedinskaya is the nearest rural locality.

References 

Rural localities in Mikhaylovka urban okrug